Jonathan Landry (born May 1, 1983) is a Canadian former professional ice hockey defenceman.

Playing career
Undrafted, on July 1, 2012, Landry was signed belatedly to his first NHL contract on a one-year deal with the New York Islanders. Landry earned his contract from the previous season in an impressive try-out with the Islanders AHL affiliate, the Bridgeport Sound Tigers. He was reassigned to the Sound Tigers to begin the 2012–13 season. In 72 games with the Sound Tigers, Landry was productive from the blueline with 8 goals and 33 points. On January 13, 2013, he received his first NHL recall by the Islanders but did not feature in a game.

On July 9, 2013, Landry left the Islanders organization as a free agent and signed a one-year two-way contract with the Minnesota Wild. On July 1, 2014, Landry signed as a free agent to a one-year two way contract with the Washington Capitals.

On November 20, 2015, Landry was offered a profession tryout with the Utica Comets of the AHL. Landry made an immediate impact on the blueline with the Comets in the 2015–16 season, and was later signed to a standard one-year deal on January 15, 2016. He finished the season posting 7 goals and 26 points in 47 games.

As a free agent, Landry continued in the AHL, returning for a second stint with the Bridgeport Sound Tigers in accepting a try-out offer to attend training camp for the 2016–17 season. He made the Sound Tigers opening night roster and later signed a one-year deal with the club at the expiration of his PTO on December 16, 2016.

Career statistics

References

External links

1983 births
Arizona Sundogs players
Augusta Lynx players
Bowdoin Polar Bears men's ice hockey players
Braehead Clan players
Bridgeport Sound Tigers players
Canadian ice hockey defencemen
Colorado Eagles players
Hershey Bears players
Iowa Wild players
Kölner Haie players
Living people
Portland Pirates players
Ice hockey people from Montreal
Utica Comets players
Canadian expatriate ice hockey players in the United States
Canadian expatriate ice hockey players in Scotland
Canadian expatriate ice hockey players in Germany